Geoffrey Brunton Smith (born 22 November 1953) is a former New Zealand cricketer who played first-class and List A cricket for Canterbury from 1977 to 1979. His father, Brun Smith, played Test cricket for New Zealand, and his grandfather, Frank Smith, played first-class cricket for Canterbury in the 1920s.

Smith was a member of the New Zealand schools cricket team that toured Australia in 1970–71. In first-class cricket he scored 22 and 31 for Canterbury against Central Districts in 1978–79; he and Barry Hadlee put on 68 and 64 respectively for the opening partnership. Later that season he made 11 and 31 against Auckland, putting on opening partnerships of 51 and 54 with Hadlee.

References

External links

1953 births
Living people
New Zealand cricketers
Canterbury cricketers
Cricketers from Christchurch